Francis Lolisi Loile Lotodo was a Kenyan Politician and a Member of Parliament for Pokot West, which was later changed to  Kapenguria Constituency in West Pokot County.

Politics 
He served from 1988 when the constituency was created until 1990 when he was arrested and detained losing his seat. He was re-elected in the 1992 General Elections and served till 1997 General Elections. He also served as Cabinet Minister in Charge of Ministry of Energy.

Death 
Hon. Lotodo died in South Africa in November 2000 undergoing treatment battling esophagus cancer. He died while serving as the member of parliament for Kapenguria Constituency.

References 

Members of the National Assembly (Kenya)
People from West Pokot County
2000 deaths
Year of birth missing